Hermann Görner, (13 April 1891 – 29 June 1956) was a famous German strongman. Görner performed in various countries and achieved feats of strength rarely matched to this day, most notably in lifts requiring exceptional gripping strength.

Early years
Görner was born in Hänichen, Saxony, Germany. Hermann was a good all round athlete with a powerful physique and worked at various times as a model for painters and sculptors.

From 1911 he competed in various weightlifting tournaments and placed fourth in the 1913 Weightlifting World Championships.

Professional strong man
Despite being injured by shrapnel and losing an eye during World War I,
Görner continued his career to become a professional strong man in 1921, touring countries such as Germany, Britain and South Africa.

His act included wrestling with a  elephant and challenging any member of the audience to lift the  barbell with  shaft which he had just raised above his head. Hermann and his wife Elsie stayed with the famous Pullum family while touring with their strength act and Hermann was known to be a witty and very personable individual whose bravery matched his physical strength.

Feats of strength
Among Hermann Görner's many feats of strength were the following notable lifts:

Deadlift –  with overhand hook grip.  with mixed grip.
One-handed block deadlift –  on 20 July 1920 Dresden, Germany
One-handed deadlift –  on 8 October 1920, Leipzig, Germany
One-handed deadlift –  on 29 October 1920, for which he later received recognition in Guinness World Records
Deadlift –  using just two fingers of each hand, normal and reverse grip was used, on 30 November 1933, Leipzig, Germany.
Goerner took a bar weighing , had two men stand, one on each end of the bar, then deadlifted it to full competition height and held it for several seconds to the satisfaction of the judges. Görner was 42 years old at the time.
Pinch lift –  on 10 July 1934, Leipzig, Germany.
Clean and Press – 
One-hand snatch of  barbell with 2 3/8 thick handle
Leg pressing 24 men, total weight , on a plank with the soles of his feet, 1921.
At Dresden on 25 July 1920, Görner lifted the enormous weight of nearly  overhead in the Two Hands ‘Anyhow’ style, performing the feat with four kettleweights in the following manner. He first swung with the right hand to arms length, two kettleweights, one weighing . and the other . Still holding the bells overhead, he then bent down and picked up with the left hand a third kettleweight weighing , which he then swung to arms length and transferred to the thumb of the right hand. Then, still holding the three kettleweights overhead in his right hand, he lowered his body carefully and with the left hand picked up the fourth kettleweight, which he slowly swung to arms length. The combined weight then held overhead for the referee’s court was, as has been stated, no less than 430 English pounds, or 195.5 kilograms.

Goerner The Mighty
Görner's life is documented in a 1951 book by Ed Müller, Goerner The Mighty.

Later years
A hand injury from a fall in 1929 somewhat curtailed his career in favour of training rather than lifting, but Görner continued to lift until World War II. After the war he was for a time held in a Soviet-run P.O.W camp, but settled later in a village near Hanover with his beloved wife Elsie, who died in 1949. Hermann was regularly visited by admirers at his small apartment and, despite the setbacks of losing his wife and war wounds, lived to the age of 65 before passing away in 1956.

References

General
Webster, David B. 1976. The Iron Game Irvine Press.
Specific

1891 births
1956 deaths
Sportspeople from Leipzig
People associated with physical culture
People from the Kingdom of Saxony
German strength athletes
German male weightlifters
German military personnel of World War I
World record setters in weightlifting